Lycopus europaeus, common names gypsywort, gipsywort, bugleweed, European bugleweed and water horehound, is a perennial plant in the genus Lycopus, native to Europe and Asia, and naturalized elsewhere. Another species, Lycopus americanus has also been erroneously called L. europaeus.

Description
The stalkless or short-stalked leaves are in opposite pairs. The leaf blades are hairy, narrowly lanceolate-ovate, sometimes pinnately-lobed, and with large teeth on the margin. The inflorescence forms a terminal spike and is composed of dense whorls of white or pale pink flowers. The upper lip of each flower is slightly convex with a notched tip and the lower lip is three-lobed, the central lobe being the largest and bearing a red "nectar mark" to attract pollinating insects. There are two stamens, the gynoecium has two fused carpels and the fruit is a four-chambered schizocarp. The flowers are visited by many types of insects, and can be characterized by a generalized pollination syndrome.

Habitat
Gypsywort grows primarily in wetland areas. It grows along the borders of lakes, ponds and streams as well as in canals and marshes. Its carpels float which may aid dispersal of the plant and its rhizomeous roots also allow the plant to spread.  It is in flower from June to September, and produces seeds from August to October.

Etymology and folklore

It is reputed to have medicinal qualities and has been used by various peoples as a dye, astringent, cosmetic, douche and narcotic.  Several research studies have been undertaken on the properties of this plant.

Rembert Dodoens wrote of the names of the plant in the 1578 English translation of his original book published in 1563, as the fourth among the group of horehounds “…: in Brabant water Andoren, and of some Egyptenaers cruyt, that is to say, the Egyptians herbe, bycause of the Rogues and runnegates which call themselves Egyptians, do colour themselves blacke with this herbe.” The Brabant original seems to suggest it was used by tramps/hobos who were pretending to be Romany people by darkening their skin. He also wrote that water horehound was not used in medicine. Through time it often came to be said that name gypsywort comes from the belief that Romani people would stain their skin with the juice of the plant, although Howard (1987) states that they used it to dye their linen.

References

External links

United States Dept. of Agriculture Plants Database
List of articles from the National Library of Medicine and the National Institutes of Health
Flora of China
Skye Flora Plant Identification
Plants for a Future Database of Edible and Medicinal Plants

europaeus
Flora of Asia
Flora of Europe
Flora of Lebanon
Medicinal plants
Plants described in 1753
Taxa named by Carl Linnaeus